Pat Bradley may refer to:

Pat Bradley (golfer) (born 1951), (female) American professional golfer
Pat Bradley (basketball) (born 1976), (male), American basketball player and coach
Pat Bradley (boxer) (1884–1976), Irish born American champion welterweight boxer

See also
Paddy Bradley (born 1981), Irish Gaelic football player